Trofeo Ronaldinho or Trofeo Meet the Star or Trofeo Nusantara was an association football exhibition competition held at the Kanjuruhan Stadium in Indonesia on 26 June 2022. Brazilian retired footballer Ronaldinho, whose the tournament was named after, also participated, playing once for RANS Nusantara in the first match against Persik.

The competition was won by Persik.

Teams 
Three teams participated in the tournament:
 Arema (host)
 Persik
 RANS Nusantara

Rules 
Each game was played for 30 minutes. To determine the winner, a points system was used. The winning team within 30 minutes received three points and the losing team none. If the match ended in a draw, a penalty shootout was used to break the tie. The winning team of the penalty shootout got two points and the losing team one.

Matches

Final table

Media

References 

Football competitions in Indonesia
2022 in Indonesian football